Meridian Hospital (also spelled Meridian Hospitals) is a private hospital located in the neighbourhood of D-line in Port Harcourt, Rivers State, Nigeria. It was founded in 1996 in a rented apartment complex in Diobu. In 2003, the hospital moved into its own building at 21 Igbokwe Street. Its capacity and workforce were subsequently increased to keep up with the growing healthcare demands.

Description and features
Meridian Hospital is bounded roughly by Government Girls Secondary School, Orominike on the north, St Thomas Anglican  Church, Ikwerre Road on the south, Kaduna Street on the east and A police station on the west. The 55m long by 18m wide  three-storey hospital sits on a 32, 670-square-foot (3, 035 m²) land. It includes a reception area, a 45-car parking lot and a  lift system. Other features are, air-conditioned and fully IT-enabled rooms, uninterruptible power and water supply, 24-hour security, modern diagnostic equipments, internet access/computers and attentive staff.

Services
Medical and Emergency
Maternity
Imaging
Laboratory
Surgery
Consultation
Radiology
Physiotherapy
Urology
Obstetrics and Gynaecology
Ophthalmology
Dental Services

See also

List of hospitals in Port Harcourt

References

External links
Meridian Hospital's Official Website

Private hospitals in Port Harcourt
1996 establishments in Nigeria
1990s establishments in Rivers State
Hospitals established in 1996
D-line, Port Harcourt